Mate Ujević (13 July 1901 – 6 January 1967) was a Croatian poet and encyclopedist.

Life
Ujević was born in Krivodol (part of Podbablje near Imotski) in the Kingdom of Dalmatia (present-day Croatia). He received his secondary education in Sinj and Split and studied literature in Zagreb. He bachelored in Ljubljana and finished his doctoral dissertation on poet Jovan Hranilović in Zagreb. In 1941 he was named the director of the institute in charge of the Croatian Encyclopedia, on which he worked until May 1945.

During World War II, Ujević rescued Manko Berman, a Jewish encyclopedist and close friend, as well as two Jewish sisters from being deported to the Jasenovac concentration camp. As a result of these actions, Yad Vashem later honored him as one of the Righteous among the Nations.

In 1950 he began work with the Yugoslav Lexicographical Institute (today's Miroslav Krleža Lexicographical Institute) where he remained until his retirement in 1965. He died in Zagreb.

Works 
 Mladost Tome Ivića (1928)
 Hrvatska književnost (1932)
 Gradišćanski Hrvati (1934)
 Hrvatska narodna pjesmarica (1938)
 Hrvatska enciklopedija [Croatian Encyclopedia] (1941–1945)

See also

 Croatian Righteous among the Nations

External links
Ujević, Mate at lzmk.hr 
Mate Ujević – his activity to save Jews' lives during the Holocaust, at Yad Vashem website

1901 births
1967 deaths
People from Podbablje
People from the Kingdom of Dalmatia
Encyclopedists
Croatian male poets
Croatian Righteous Among the Nations
University of Ljubljana alumni
University of Zagreb alumni
Burials at Mirogoj Cemetery
20th-century Croatian poets
20th-century male writers